CFR Title 19 – Customs Duties is one of fifty titles comprising the United States Code of Federal Regulations (CFR), containing the principal set of rules and regulations issued by federal agencies regarding customs duties. It is available in digital and printed form, and can be referenced online using the Electronic Code of Federal Regulations (e-CFR).

Structure 

The table of contents, as reflected in the e-CFR updated March 4, 2014, is as follows:

See also
 Customs ruling

Notes 

 19